Vukašin Šoškoćanin (24 June 1958 – 15 May 1991) was a Croatian Serb war commander active during the Croatian War.

Biography
Born to Milan and Ljubica Šoškoćanin on 24 June 1958, Vukašin had two brothers, Radovan and Dušan. He became a member of the Serb Democratic Party in 1990. He was a veterinary technician in Vukovar. Šoškoćanin was president of the Borovo commune and commander of the Borovo Selo Territorial Defense Force during the Croatian War, most notably during the Battle of Borovo Selo.

Death and legacy
On 15 May 1991 at around 10:30 AM, while returning from a visit to a refugee camp in Vojvodina, he died by drowning in the Danube river in a "boating accident." 

Milan Paroški publicly questioned the official cause of death and claimed that frogmen (either the Yugoslav River Flotilla or the Serbian State Security) were responsible for Šoškoćanin's death. Paroški also claimed that Šoškoćanin was "an excellent swimmer." His death is still labeled under "mysterious circumstances."

After his death, an elementary school in Borovo was named in his honour. He was posthumously awarded the title of "Hero of the People" in Beli Manastir on 25 September 1991.

References

External links

1958 births
1991 deaths
Serbs of Croatia
Serbian soldiers
Military personnel of the Croatian War of Independence
Republic of Serbian Krajina
Deaths by drowning
Death conspiracy theories
Burials at Serbian Orthodox monasteries and churches